Trinity Episcopal Church is a historic Episcopal church located near Scotland Neck, Halifax County, North Carolina, United States.  The congregation was founded in February 1833 by a number of prominent citizens including State Senator Simmons Baker. It was built in 1855, and is a rectangular Gothic Revival style brick building. Its design is attributed to noted New York architect Frank Wills. It has a gable roof, front central tower, and lancet windows. The church was rebuilt after it burned in 1885.

It was listed on the National Register of Historic Places in 1980.

References

Episcopal church buildings in North Carolina
Churches on the National Register of Historic Places in North Carolina
Gothic Revival church buildings in North Carolina
Churches completed in 1855
19th-century Episcopal church buildings
Churches in Halifax County, North Carolina
National Register of Historic Places in Halifax County, North Carolina